Cassy and Jude is an unreleased British romantic comedy film directed by Marc Evans, based on the novel Cassandra at the Wedding by Dorothy Baker.

Plot
A young woman's life is sent into a tailspin when she finds out her twin sister is marrying someone she just recently met.

Production
Cassy and Jude is adapted from the novel Cassandra at the Wedding by Dorothy Baker, with a screenplay by Bruno Heller. In December 2010, British director, Dominic Murphy signed on to direct the project. In 2013, it was announced that Marc Evans had replaced Murphy as director for the project with its international sales handled by Germany's BetaCinema and funded by Film Agency Wales. Photography was completed in 2015.

References

External links
 (F&ME Ltd)

English-language films
English-language Welsh films
Unreleased films
British romantic comedy films
Welsh films
Films shot in Wales
Films directed by Marc Evans